Polar Beverages is a soft drink company based in Worcester, Massachusetts. It is a manufacturer and distributor of sparkling fruit beverages, seltzer, ginger ale, drink mixers, and spring water to customers in the United States. It is the largest independent soft-drink bottler in the United States.

It markets beverages under its flagship brand, Polar Beverages, and under the brands Adirondack Beverages, Polar Seltzer, and Cape Cod Dry. In addition to its own drinks, Polar bottles and distributes national brands for companies such as Keurig Dr Pepper. The company has two bottling plants and six distribution facilities; it also offers corporate water services and beverage vending equipment.

It is a fourth-generation, family-owned business that traces its roots to 1882; and is run by Ralph Crowley Jr., the great-grandson of founder Dennis M. Crowley.

History
Polar was founded by Ralph’s great-grandfather, Dennis Mark "Boss" Crowley. The business began in the 1880s as the J. G. Bieberbach Company, a liquor company. In 1916, the company took on the Polar name, but Prohibition brought about a fundamental change. Polar stopped selling whiskey and began selling carbonated beverages like waters, ginger ales and drys.

Flavors 
Polar Beverages prides themselves on seltzers and drinks flavored with real fruit and ingredients. Every year the company uses an in-house drink mixologist to create 5 limited edition varieties at two separate times of year to always incorporate new flavors to keep the brand fresh.

Partnership with Keurig 
Polar has recently partnered up with Keurig Dr Pepper to expand their products that have gained a large following in the Northeast and expanding them to markets across the nation. The deal allows the Crowley family to still own the company but also direct access to Keurig's delivery to store method and marketing network. Polar's actions with this partnership show their overall willingness to grow into a national product for consumers across the nation.

Mascot

A polar bear named Orson has been the company's mascot since 1902. Next to the company's billboard near I-290 in Worcester, there is a large inflatable version of Orson, which can be seen smiling and "waving" to passersby. The oversized bear is tied down by wire, to keep the bear in place during rough weather, and to prevent theft. Orson has sometimes been stolen by local fraternities as a prank.

Conflict with Coca-Cola
In 1994, Polar made a TV commercial where a polar bear considers drinking a Coca-Cola, but throws it into a recycling bin marked, "Keep the Arctic pure."  The polar bear then reaches down into the freezing Arctic water and pulls out a can of Polar Seltzer and drinks from it contentedly.  Coca-Cola filed a motion for an injunction against Polar in United States District Court in Boston, contending that the commercial made Coke's product appear impure.

The court granted Coca-Cola's motion because the commercial "implied that Coke [was] not pure" and misrepresented the nature and quality of Coke, thereby potentially harming the soft drink irreparably. The injunction required Polar to revise the ad.  According to Polar, the judge's ruling affirmed the right of Polar to use a polar bear in its ads, but limited them from discarding the Coke can.

See also
 Polar Park (baseball park)

References

External links
 Polar Beverages - Official website
 Hoovers.com
 PSBC - The Painted Soda Bottle Collectors Association

Drink companies of the United States
American soft drinks
Companies based in Worcester, Massachusetts
Food and drink companies established in 1882
1882 establishments in Massachusetts
Economy of the Northeastern United States
Privately held companies based in Massachusetts
Food and drink companies based in Massachusetts
Soft drinks manufacturers
Family-owned companies of the United States